Saoud Al-Ali (Arabic:سعود العلي) (born 29 October 1989) is a Qatari footballer who plays as a midfielder .

Career
He formerly played for Qatar, Al-Khor, Al-Kharaitiyat, Al-Rayyan, Muaither, Al-Shamal, Mesaimeer and Lusail .

External links

References

Living people
1989 births
Qatari footballers
Qatar SC players
Al-Khor SC players
Al Kharaitiyat SC players
Al-Rayyan SC players
Muaither SC players
Al-Shamal SC players
Mesaimeer SC players
Lusail SC players
Qatar Stars League players
Qatari Second Division players
Association football midfielders
Place of birth missing (living people)